Roger Heigham (by 1515 – 29 August 1558), also spelt Roger Higham, was an English politician and Tudor administrator.

He was a Member (MP) of the Parliament of England for Gatton in 1545.  A Protestant reformer under Henry VIII of England he was responsible for the sale of many previously monastic buildings and estates.  Somewhat ironically, given his Protestant faith, he is perhaps most remembered as the Grandfather of Saint Anne Line, a devout Catholic martyred in 1601.

References

1558 deaths
English MPs 1545–1547
Year of birth uncertain